Temple Newsam is an electoral ward of Leeds City Council in east Leeds, West Yorkshire, covering the outer city suburbs of Colton, Halton, Halton Moor and Whitkirk. Austhorpe is also shared with Cross Gates and Whinmoor ward, whilst the current civil parish boundaries of Austhorpe see its eastern half lie in the western tip of Garforth and Swillington ward.

The ward population at the 2011 Census was 21,543 and ward itself is named after the Temple Newsam estate.

Boundaries 
The Temple Newsam ward includes the civil parish of Austhorpe (west half).

Councillors since 1973 

 indicates seat up for re-election.
 indicates seat up for election following resignation or death of sitting councillor.
* indicates incumbent councillor.

Elections since 2010

May 2022

May 2021

May 2019

May 2018

May 2016

May 2015

May 2014

May 2012

May 2011

May 2010

See also
Listed buildings in Leeds (Temple Newsam Ward)

Notes

References

Wards of Leeds